Capital Mall is a shopping mall located in Olympia, Washington. The anchor stores are REI, Total Wine & More, Macy's, Dick's Sporting Goods, JCPenney, Best Buy, and Century Theatres. The mall was known as Westfield Capital from 1998 to 2013, when it was owned by the Westfield Group. In 2013, Starwood Capital Group purchased the mall and it is now managed by Pacific Retail Capital Partners.

History
Capital Mall opened on October 5, 1978 and was developed by The Hahn Company. A 1978 article in The Spokesman-Review stated that Capital Mall was an integral factor in development of the city of Olympia. Concurrently with the mall, a number of retail developments and fast-food restaurants were also built around the mall. Construction of the mall required the city of Olympia to spend $3 million on road and traffic improvements, as the mall's development was predicted to more than triple the amount of traffic in the area.

The mall began with four anchor department stores: The Bon Marche, JCPenney, Frederick and Nelson, and Lamonts. J. C. Penney's store cost about $2.7 million to build and was designed by the Los Angeles, California firm of Burke Nicolais Archuleta.

On August 18, 1991, a fire broke out on the mall's roof, causing over $3 million in damage.

Frederick & Nelson was sold to Mervyns in 1992. 

The mall was acquired in 1998 by Westfield America, Inc., a precursor of the Westfield Group, which renamed it "Westfield Shoppingtown Capital", dropping the "Shoppingtown" from the name in 2005.

Upon acquisition by Westfield, it underwent a $50 million expansion and renovation. One facet of the expansion opened in 2002, when the vacated Lamonts store was replaced by a Best Buy and a food court.

Mervyns closed its  store on December 31, 2006 and the space has since been divided into smaller sections: Forever 21 opened in August 2010, REI opened in May 2011, and Total Wine & More opened July 2013. Forever 21 closed for good in September 2018. 

In October 2013, Westfield sold a controlling interest in several malls in the United States to Starwood Retail Partners, which included Capital Mall In 2013, for 1.6 billion.

In October 2016, Dick's Sporting Goods opened a new store in the mall.

References

External links
Capital Mall Official Site

Shopping malls in Washington (state)
Shopping malls established in 1978
Buildings and structures in Olympia, Washington
Tourist attractions in Thurston County, Washington
1977 establishments in Washington (state)